Hallingmål-Valdris (also known by the individual names Halling, Hallingdøl, or Valdresmål) is a group of Norwegian dialects traditionally spoken in the traditional districts Hallingdal, Buskerud and Valdres, Oppland.

Phonology

Consonants
  is usually realized as a prestopped nasal , while the allophone  only occurs in words like baren "the bar".
  also has a prestopped realization .
In Vang,  occurs only in the first case.

Vowels
 Traditionally,  were pronounced as open-mid .
 The words pronounced  and  mean "I" and "am", respectively.
This is occurs today especially in upper Valdres and Hol and Ål.

Grammar

Citations

Notes

References

Literature

 
 
 
 
 
 

Valdres
Hallingdal
Norwegian dialects